Prohibitionism is a legal philosophy and political theory often used in lobbying which holds that citizens will abstain from actions if the actions are typed as unlawful (i.e. prohibited) and the prohibitions are enforced by law enforcement. This philosophy has been the basis for many acts of statutory law throughout history, most notably when a large group of a given population disapproves of and/or feels threatened by an activity in which a smaller group of that population engages, and seeks to render that activity legally prohibited.

Examples 
Acts of prohibition have included prohibitions on types of clothing (and prohibitions on lack of clothing), prohibitions on gambling and exotic dancing, the prohibition of drugs (for example, alcohol prohibition and cannabis prohibition), prohibitions on tobacco smoking, and gun prohibition. Indeed, the period of Prohibition in the United States between 1920 and 1933 due to the Eighteenth Amendment and the Volstead Act often is referred to simply as "Prohibition", as is the "War on Drugs" that succeeded it.

Criticism 

The success of a measure of prohibitionism has been criticized as often depending too much upon effective enforcement of the relevant legislation. Some people have argued this is because the majority of the targets of prohibitionism are in the category of victimless crime, where they claim the harm that comes from the crime is non-existent, questionable, or only to the person who performs the act and even then the magnitude of the harm being relatively small. Under this interpretation enforcement becomes a conflict between violation of statue and violation of free will. Since the acts prohibited often are enjoyable, enforcement is often the most harmful choice to the individual. This sometimes results in laws which rarely are enforced by anybody who does not have a financial or personal motivation to do so.

The difficulty of enforcing prohibitionist laws also criticized as resulting in selective enforcement, wherein the enforcers select the people they wish to prosecute based on other criteria, resulting in discrimination based on races, culture, nationality, or financial status. For example, American philosopher Noam Chomsky has criticized drug prohibition as being a technique of social control of the "so-called dangerous classes".

Prohibitionism based laws have the added problem of calling attention to the behavior that they are attempting to prohibit.  This can make the behavior interesting and exciting, and cause its popularity to increase. This is essentially in relation with the Streisand effect.

See also 

Gambling
Gambling in the United States
Gun prohibition
Lobbying
Prohibition
Prohibition in the United States
Prohibition of alcohol
Prohibition of drugs
Prohibition Party 
Repugnancy costs
Scottish Prohibition Party
Smokeasy
Smoking ban
Speakeasy
Sumptuary law
Temperance movement

Notes

External links 
Peter Cohen, Re-thinking drug control policy – Historical perspectives and conceptual tools, United Nations Research Institute for Social Development, 1993
Simon Lenton, "Policy from a harm reduction perspective", Current Opinion in Psychiatry 16(3):271–277, May 2003
Harry G. Levine, "Global drug prohibition: its uses and crises", International Journal of Drug Policy, 14(2): 145–153, April 2003 (journal article)
Should cannabis be taxed and regulated? (journal article)
Learning from history: a review of David Bewley-Taylor's The United States and International Drug Control, 1909–1997 (journal article)
Shifting the main purposes of drug control: from suppression to regulation of use
 Setting goals for drug policy: harm or use reduction?
 Prohibition, pragmatism and drug policy repatriation
Challenging the UN drug control conventions: problems and possibilities

 
Alcohol law
Social conflict
Drug control law
Law enforcement in the United States
Philosophy of law
Political science terminology
Political theories
Prohibition
Tobacco control